De Peel is a region in the southeast of the Netherlands that straddles the border between the provinces of North Brabant and Limburg.

The region is best known for the extraction of peat for fuel, which had been going on since the Middle Ages but is no longer done. For this purpose many canals were dug to remove the water and for ships to move out the peat.

An area that has remained partly untouched by the peat-cutting was turned into a National Park, the Groote Peel. It has a size of 13.4 km².

It is one of the most bird-rich areas in Western Europe, with resident black-necked grebes and sometimes migrating common cranes in October/November. The terrain is varied with inaccessible peat swamps, lakes, heath land and sand ridges. The present swamp and some of the lakes were created by the cutting of peat.

There are very many villages in the Peel, the most of them founded by bosses of peat companies.
For example: Helenaveen and Griendtsveen, founded by Jan van de Griendt (1804–1882)

Trivia
 The Northern Limburgish band Rowwen Hèze made a well-known song about the area named: De Peel in brand (The Peel on fire).

External link

Regions of North Brabant
Regions of Limburg (Netherlands)
Regions of the Netherlands
Bogs of the Netherlands